Malleastrum is a genus of plants in the family Meliaceae containing 21 species native to Madagascar, Comoros and Aldabra.

Species

The genus Malleastrum contains the following 21 species:

Malleastrum antsingyense 
Malleastrum boivinianum 
Malleastrum contractum 
Malleastrum depauperatum  (synonym:Malleastrum leroyi )
Malleastrum gracile 
Malleastrum horokoke 
Malleastrum isalense 
Malleastrum letouzeyanum 
Malleastrum mandenense 
Malleastrum minutifoliolatum 
Malleastrum mocquerysii 
Malleastrum obtusifolium 
Malleastrum orientale 
Malleastrum perrieri 
Malleastrum pseudodepauperatum 
Malleastrum rakotozafyi 
Malleastrum ramiflorum 
Malleastrum sambiranense 
Malleastrum schatzii 
Malleastrum sepaliferum 
Malleastrum tampolense

See also
 Francis Raymond Fosberg

References

 
Meliaceae genera
Taxonomy articles created by Polbot
Taxa named by Henri Ernest Baillon